Ion-Georgy Kostev (born March 24, 1990) is a Russian professional ice hockey defenceman who is currently an unrestricted free agent. He most notably played for HC Neftekhimik Nizhnekamsk of the Kontinental Hockey League (KHL).

On October 16, 2018, Kostev was given a two-year ban for a doping violation.

References

External links

1990 births
Living people
HC Almaty players
Dizel Penza players
Doping cases in ice hockey
HK Dubnica players
HC Izhstal players
HC Neftekhimik Nizhnekamsk players
Neftyanik Almetyevsk players
Neftyanik Leninogorsk players
KHK Red Star players
Rubin Tyumen players
Russian ice hockey defencemen
Russian sportspeople in doping cases
Sputnik Nizhny Tagil players
Russian expatriate sportspeople in Kazakhstan
Russian expatriate sportspeople in Slovakia
Expatriate ice hockey players in Slovakia
Expatriate ice hockey players in Kazakhstan
Russian expatriate ice hockey people
Russian expatriate sportspeople in Serbia
Expatriate ice hockey players in Serbia